Michael Van Den Ham (born 2 August 1992) is a Canadian cyclo-cross cyclist. He competed in the men's elite event at the 2016 UCI Cyclo-cross World Championships in Heusden-Zolder.

Major results

2013–2014
 1st  National Under-23 Championships
2014–2015
 2nd Jingle Cross 3
 2nd Manitoba Grand Prix of Cyclocross
 3rd National Championships
2015–2016
 1st The Cycle-Smart International 1
2016–2017
 2nd CRAFT Sportswear Gran Prix of Gloucester
 2nd Resolution 'Cross Cup 2
 3rd Resolution 'Cross Cup 1
 3rd Ruts n' Guts Day 1
 3rd CXLA Weekend - Day 2
2017–2018
 1st  National Championships
 1st Major Taylor 'Cross Cup Day 2
 2nd US Open of Cyclocross Day 1
 2nd Resolution 'Cross Cup 1
 3rd  Pan American Championships
 3rd Resolution 'Cross Cup 2
 3rd Ruts n' Guts Day 2
 3rd Major Taylor 'Cross Cup Day 1
 3rd US Open of Cyclocross Day 2
2018–2019
 1st  National Championships
 2nd  Pan American Championships
 3rd Ruts 'n' Guts Day 2
 3rd Silver Goose Cyclocross Festival
 3rd TBOCX - Lift Lock Cross
2019–2020
 1st  National Championships
 1st Resolution 'Cross Cup 1 & 2
 1st Ruts 'n' Guts Day 1
 1st PTBOCX
 2nd Ruts 'n' Guts Day 2

References

External links

1992 births
Living people
Cyclo-cross cyclists
Canadian male cyclists
Sportspeople from Halifax, Nova Scotia